Joseph P. Fitzmartin (born in Philadelphia, 1943) is an American composer and arranger. He is one of the founders and the Music Director of the Keystone State Boychoir as well as Choral Director at the William Penn Charter School in Philadelphia.

His Concert Mass for symphony orchestra and choir, had its world premiere at Carnegie Hall and has since been performed at the Sydney Opera House, in Berlin, and in Russia by the Novgorod Symphony. Following an international composition competition, he was awarded a grant from the Basel Boys Choir of Switzerland to compose a major work for an international celebration of youth choirs. The work featured the German text of the poet Hanns Dieter Hüsch and continues to be performed throughout that country.

Sources
Keystone State Boychoir Joseph Fitzmartin, Music Director

1943 births
Living people
Catholic University of America alumni
American male conductors (music)
American male composers
21st-century American composers
Musicians from Philadelphia
Classical musicians from Pennsylvania
21st-century American conductors (music)
21st-century male musicians